Edward H. Swan House is a historic home located in the village of Cove Neck, New York on Long Island.  It was built in 1859 in the Second Empire style. The rectangular house is built of double brick walls spaced nine inches apart.  It is a substantial -story residence topped by a mansard roof of hexagonal shaped slate.  The main entrance features a double entrance door beneath a cast iron portico.  Also on the property are several barns and a board and batten-sided cottage.

It was listed on the National Register of Historic Places in 1976.

The house was owned by John McEnroe Sr., father of the tennis pro, before becoming the home of John McEnroe Jr and his wife Tatum O'Neal.  On January 25, 1990, the property was used as a makeshift morgue following the crash of Avianca Flight 52 which crashed into the hills of Cove Neck after running out of fuel.

References

Houses on the National Register of Historic Places in New York (state)
Second Empire architecture in New York (state)
Houses completed in 1859
Houses in Nassau County, New York
National Register of Historic Places in Nassau County, New York